The 2014–15 Atlanta Hawks season was the 66th season of the franchise in the National Basketball Association (NBA) and the 47th in Atlanta. Their Southeast Division championship was the first for the Hawks since winning the Central Division in 1994. It was the best finish by the team since finishing first in the Eastern Conference during the 1993–94 season. This was the first time since the Southeast Division was created for the 2004–05 season that the division title was not won by a team from the state of Florida.

The Hawks finished the season with a 60–22 record for a franchise high in wins, earning them the first seed in the Eastern Conference and home court advantage for the Conference. The Hawks would reach their first-ever Conference Finals since the NBA was split into two conferences, but their season ended with a four-game sweep against the Cleveland Cavaliers, the team that swept them in the 2009 Conference Semi-finals. The Cavaliers would go on to lose to the Golden State Warriors in the Finals in six games. The Hawks became the first #1 seed to get swept in a playoff series since the Detroit Pistons in 2003 as well as the first #1 seed since the 2011–12 San Antonio Spurs to lose in the Conference Finals. Their 22 wins improvement was the second largest by a team that made playoffs in consecutive non-lockout seasons behind 25 wins by the 1995–96 Chicago Bulls.

The Hawks would not return to the Conference Finals until 2021 where they were defeated by the eventual champion Milwaukee Bucks, led by former Hawks coach Mike Budenholzer, in six games.

Preseason

Draft picks

Roster

}

}

Regular season

Standings

Game log

Pre-season

|- style="background:#cfc;"
| 1
| October 6
| New Orleans
| 
| John Jenkins (13)
| Mike Muscala (10)
| Schröder, Millsap (4)
| Philips Arena10,146
| 1–0
|- style="background:#fcc;"
| 2
| October 11
| @ Memphis
| 
| John Jenkins (15)
| Adreian Payne (8)
| Shelvin Mack (8)
| FedExForum11,867
| 1–1
|- style="background:#cfc;"
| 3
| October 14
| @ Miami
| 
| Paul Millsap (23)
| DeMarre Carroll (6)
| Jeff Teague (5)
| American Airlines Arena19,600
| 2–1
|- style="background:#fcc;"
| 4
| October 16
| @ Chicago
| 
| Mike Scott (15)
| Horford & Brand (6)
| Dennis Schröder (6)
| United Center21,405
| 2–2
|- style="background:#fcc;"
| 5
| October 18
| Detroit
| 
| Jeff Teague (16)
| Millsap, Korver (7)
| Jeff Teague (10)
| Philips Arena10,560
| 2–3
|- style="background:#cfc;"
| 6
| October 20
| Charlotte
| 
| Paul Millsap (21)
| Thabo Sefolosha (8)
| Sefolosha & Schröder (5)
| Philips Arena8,148
| 3–3
|- style="background:#cfc;"
| 7
| October 22
| @ San Antonio
| 
| Jeff Teague (21)
| Paul Millsap (8)
| Paul Millsap (5)
| AT&T Center16,711
| 4–3

Regular season

|- style="background:#fcc;"
| 1
| October 29
| @ Toronto
| 
| Korver, Scott, & Teague (20)
| Al Horford (13)
| Jeff Teague (8)
| Air Canada Centre19,800
| 0–1

|- style="background:#cfc;"
| 2
| November 1
| Indiana
| 
| Jeff Teague (25)
| DeMarre Carroll (9)
| Jeff Teague (6)
| Philips Arena19,118
| 1–1
|- style="background:#fcc;"
| 3
| November 5
| @ San Antonio
| 
| Millsap & Carroll (17)
| Millsap & Horford (7)
| Jeff Teague (7)
| AT&T Center18,581
| 1–2
|- style="background:#fcc;"
| 4
| November 7
| @ Charlotte
| 
| Al Horford (24)
| Al Horford (10)
| Jeff Teague (15)
| Time Warner Cable Arena15,891
| 1–3
|- style="background:#cfc;"
| 5
| November 8
| New York
| 
| Kyle Korver (27)
| Paul Millsap (13)
| Jeff Teague (5)
| Philips Arena17,521
| 2–3
|- style="background:#cfc;"
| 6
| November 10
| @ New York
| 
| Paul Millsap (19)
| DeMarre Carroll (10)
| Jeff Teague (6)
| Madison Square Garden19,812
| 3–3
|- style="background:#cfc;"
| 7
| November 12
| Utah
| 
| Paul Millsap (30)
| Paul Millsap (17)
| Jeff Teague (8)
| Philips Arena12,595
| 4–3
|- style="background:#cfc;"
| 8
| November 14
| Miami
| 
| Millsap & Horford (19)
| Paul Millsap (9)
| Jeff Teague (9)
| Philips Arena17,090
| 5–3
|- style="background:#fcc;"
| 9
| November 15
| @ Cleveland
| 
| Paul Millsap (16)
| Paul Millsap (7)
| Shelvin Mack (6)
| Quicken Loans Arena20,562
| 5–4
|- style="background:#fcc;"
| 10
| November 18
| LA Lakers
| 
| Paul Millsap (29)
| Thabo Sefolosha (9)
| Shelvin Mack (5)
| Philips Arena17,848
| 5–5
|- style="background:#cfc;"
| 11
| November 21
| Detroit
| 
| Jeff Teague (28)
| Paul Millsap (12)
| Jeff Teague (6)
| Philips Arena16,517
| 6–5
|- style="background:#cfc;"
| 12
| November 25
| @ Washington
| 
| Jeff Teague (28)
| Paul Millsap (11)
| Shelvin Mack (5)
| Verizon Center15,440
| 7–5
|- style="background:#fcc;"
| 13
| November 26
| Toronto
| 
| Jeff Teague (24)
| Al Horford (9)
| Jeff Teague (12)
| Philips Arena16,253
| 7–6
|- style="background:#cfc;"
| 14
| November 28
| New Orleans
| 
| Jeff Teague (26)
| Al Horford (10)
| Jeff Teague (7)
| Philips Arena17,079
| 8–6
|- style="background:#cfc;"
| 15
| November 29
| Charlotte
| 
| Paul Millsap (18)
| Elton Brand (9)
| Jeff Teague (10)
| Philips Arena14,185
| 9–6

|- style="background:#cfc;"
| 16
| December 2
| Boston
| 
| Kyle Korver (24)
| Millsap, Horford, Korver (6)
| Jeff Teague (9)
| Philips Arena12,705
| 10–6
|- style="background:#cfc;"
| 17
| December 3
| @ Miami
| 
| Jeff Teague (27)
| Millsap, Korver (6)
| Jeff Teague (6)
| American Airlines Arena19,600
| 11–6
|- style="background:#cfc;"
| 18
| December 5
| @ Brooklyn
| 
| DeMarre Carroll (18)
| Paul Millsap (9)
| Teague, Schroder (5)
| Barclays Center16,146
| 12–6
|- style="background:#cfc;"
| 19
| December 7
| Denver
| 
| Paul Millsap (23)
| DeMarre Carroll (9)
| Jeff Teague (7)
| Philips Arena12,143
| 13–6
|- style="background:#cfc;"
| 20
| December 8
| @ Indiana
| 
| Al Horford (25)
| Horford, Millsap (8)
| Jeff Teague (7)
| Bankers Life Fieldhouse14,519
| 14–6
|- style="background:#cfc;"
| 21
| December 10
| Philadelphia
| 
| Korver, Millsap (17)
| DeMarre Carroll (11)
| Jeff Teague (6)
| Philips Arena11,733
| 15–6
|- style="background:#cfc;"
| 22
| December 12
| Orlando
| 
| Paul Millsap (23)
| Paul Millsap (8)
| Teague, Schroder (5)
| Philips Arena13,247
| 16–6
|- style="background:#fcc;"
| 23
| December 13
| @ Orlando
| 
| Jeff Teague (24)
| Paul Millsap (10)
| Jeff Teague (8)
| Amway Center15,939
| 16–7
|- style="background:#cfc;"
| 24
| December 15
| Chicago
| 
| Al Horford (21)
| Al Horford (10)
| Jeff Teague (7)
| Philips Arena16,805
| 17–7
|- style="background:#cfc;"
| 25
| December 17
| @ Cleveland
| 
| Shelvin Mack (24)
| Paul Millsap (8)
| Dennis Schroder (10)
| Quicken Loans Arena20,562
| 18–7
|- style="background:#cfc;"
| 26
| December 20
| @ Houston
| 
| Kyle Korver (22)
| Al Horford (8)
| Dennis Schroder (6)
| Toyota Center16,998
| 19–7
|- style="background:#cfc;"
| 27
| December 22
| @ Dallas
| 
| Dennis Schroder (22)
| Paul Millsap (12)
| Paul Millsap (7)
| American Airlines Center20,339
| 20–7
|- style="background:#cfc;"
| 28
| December 23
| LA Clippers
| 
| DeMarre Carroll (25)
| DeMarre Carroll (10)
| Paul Millsap (7)
| Philips Arena19,191
| 21–7
|- style="background:#fcc;"
| 29
| December 26
| Milwaukee
| 
| Paul Millsap (22)
| Paul Millsap (11)
| Teague, Korver, Mack (4)
| Philips Arena19,016
| 21–8
|- style="background:#cfc;"
| 30
| December 27
| @ Milwaukee
| 
| Jeff Teague (25)
| Al Horford (9)
| Jeff Teague (7)
| BMO Harris Bradley Center16,788
| 22–8
|- style="background:#cfc;"
| 31
| December 30
| Cleveland
| 
| Paul Millsap (26)
| Millsap, Carroll (9)
| Jeff Teague (11)
| Philips Arena19,215
| 23–8

|- style="background:#cfc;"
| 32
| January 2
| @ Utah
| 
| Jeff Teague (26)
| Paul Millsap (11)
| Jeff Teague (8)
| EnergySolutions Arena19,029
| 24–8
|- style="background:#cfc;"
| 33
| January 3
| @ Portland
| 
| Paul Millsap (27)
| Thabo Sefolosha (12)
| Jeff Teague (6)
| Moda Center19,829
| 25–8
|- style="background:#cfc;"
| 34
| January 5
| @ LA Clippers
| 
| Paul Millsap (23)
| Millsap, Carroll (8)
| Jeff Teague (9)
| Staples Center19,060
| 26–8
|- style="background:#cfc;"
| 35
| January 7
| Memphis
| 
| Jeff Teague (25)
| Paul Millsap (9)
| Jeff Teague (6)
| Philips Arena17,126
| 27–8
|- style="background:#cfc;"
| 36
| January 9
| @ Detroit
| 
| Al Horford (19)
| Al Horford (16)
| Jeff Teague (11)
| The Palace of Auburn Hills18,859
| 28–8
|- style="background:#cfc;"
| 37
| January 11
| Washington
| 
| Kyle Korver (19)
| Thabo Sefolosha (8)
| Jeff Teague (10)
| Philips Arena18,057
| 29–8
|- style="background:#cfc;"
| 38
| January 13
| @ Philadelphia
| 
| Al Horford (21)
| Al Horford (10)
| Horford, Mack (10)
| Wells Fargo Center10,466
| 30–8
|- style="background:#cfc;"
| 39
| January 14
| @ Boston
| 
| Teague, Carroll (22)
| Paul Millsap (10)
| Jeff Teague (6)
| TD Garden16,067
| 31–8
|- style="background:#cfc;"
| 40
| January 16
| @ Toronto
| 
| Al Horford (22)
| Paul Millsap (8)
| Jeff Teague (9)
| Air Canada Centre19,800
| 32–8
|- style="background:#cfc;"
| 41
| January 17
| @ Chicago
| 
| Kyle Korver (24)
| Al Horford (9)
| Jeff Teague (11)
| United Center22,024
| 33–8
|- style="background:#cfc;"
| 42
| January 19
| Detroit
| 
| Millsap, Scott (20)
| Paul Millsap (7)
| Teague, Horford (7)
| Philips Arena19,108
| 34–8
|- style="background:#cfc;"
| 43
| January 21
| Indiana
| 
| Carroll, Teague (17)
| Paul Millsap (9)
| Jeff Teague (11)
| Philips Arena15,045
| 35–8
|- style="background:#cfc;"
| 44
| January 23
| Oklahoma City
| 
| Paul Millsap (22)
| Al Horford (12)
| Jeff Teague (9)
| Philips Arena19,203
| 36–8
|- style="background:#cfc;"
| 45
| January 25
| Minnesota
| 
| Paul Millsap (20)
| Horford, Carroll (6)
| Jeff Teague (7)
| Philips Arena18,049
| 37–8
|- style="background:#cfc;"
| 46
| January 28
| Brooklyn
| 
| Paul Millsap (28)
| Paul Millsap (15)
| Jeff Teague (11)
| Philips Arena18,047
| 38–8
|- style="background:#cfc;"
| 47
| January 30
| Portland
| 
| Paul Millsap (21)
| Millsap, Horford (8)
| Jeff Teague (8)
| Philips Arena19,018
| 39–8
|- style="background:#cfc;"
| 48
| January 31
| Philadelphia
| 
| Al Horford (23)
| Al Horford (11)
| Jeff Teague (7)
| Philips Arena19,006
| 40–8

|- style="background:#fcc;"
| 49
| February 2
| @ New Orleans
| 
| Jeff Teague (21)
| Al Horford (9)
| Jeff Teague (7)
| Smoothie King Center15,487
| 40–9
|- style="background:#cfc;"
| 50
| February 4
| Washington
| 
| Jeff Teague (26)
| Al Horford (13)
| Jeff Teague (8)
| Philips Arena18,047
| 41–9
|- style="background:#cfc;"
| 51
| February 6
| Golden State
| 
| Jeff Teague (23)
| Al Horford (14)
| Teague, Schroder (7)
| Philips Arena19,225
| 42–9
|- style="background:#fcc;"
| 52
| February 8
| @ Memphis
| 
| Jeff Teague (22)
| Al Horford (12)
| Jeff Teague (6)
| FedExForum18,119
| 42–10
|- style="background:#cfc;"
| 53
| February 9
| @ Minnesota
| 
| Al Horford (28)
| Paul Millsap (9)
| Teague, Millsap (7)
| Target Center10,987
| 43–10
|- style="background:#fcc;"
| 54
| February 11
| @ Boston
| 
| Al Horford (22)
| Al Horford (12)
| Jeff Teague (8)
| TD Garden16,083
| 43–11
|- align="center"
|colspan="9" bgcolor="#bbcaff"|All-Star Break
|- style="background:#fff;"
|- style="background:#fcc;"
| 55
| February 20
| Toronto
| 
| Millsap, Teague, Korver (11)
| Al Horford (12)
| Jeff Teague (5)
| Philips Arena18,968
| 43–12
|- style="background:#cfc;"
| 56
| February 22
| @ Milwaukee
|
| Paul Millsap (23)
| Paul Millsap (16)
| Dennis Schröder (9)
| BMO Harris Bradley Center14,787
| 44–12
|- style="background:#cfc;"
| 57
| February 25
| Dallas
| 
| Dennis Schröder (17)
| Millsap & Horford (8)
| Al Horford (6)
| Philips Arena16,126
| 45–12
|- style="background:#cfc;"
| 58
| February 27
| Orlando
| 
| Paul Millsap (20)
| Al Horford (13)
| Jeff Teague (7)
| Philips Arena18,968
| 46–12
|- style="background:#cfc;"
| 59
| February 28
| @ Miami
| 
| Paul Millsap (22)
| Elton Brand (8)
| Dennis Schröder (10)
| American Airlines Arena19,733
| 47–12

|- style="background:#cfc;"
| 60
| March 3
| Houston
| 
| Jeff Teague (25)
| Paul Millsap (14)
| Dennis Schröder (8)
| Philips Arena18,968
| 48–12
|- style="background:#cfc;"
| 61
| March 6
| Cleveland
| 
| Al Horford (19)
| Al Horford (9)
| Dennis Schröder (8)
| Philips Arena19,244
| 49–12
|- style="background:#fcc;"
| 62
| March 7
| @ Philadelphia
| 
| Jeff Teague (17)
| Kent Bazemore (9)
| Dennis Schröder (6)
| Wells Fargo Center17,624
| 49–13
|- style="background:#cfc;"
| 63
| March 9
| Sacramento
| 
| Korver & Carroll (20)
| Carroll & Teague (5)
| Jeff Teague (13)
| Philips Arena18,047
| 50–13
|- style="background:#fcc;"
| 64
| March 11
| @ Denver
| 
| Kyle Korver (18)
| Paul Millsap (5)
| Shelvin Mack (5)
| Pepsi Center13,217
| 50–14
|- style="background:#cfc;"
| 65
| March 13
| @ Phoenix
| 
| Paul Millsap (23)
| Paul Millsap (9)
| Jeff Teague (9)
| US Airways Center17,136
| 51–14
|- style="background:#cfc;"
| 66
| March 15
| @ LA Lakers
| 
| Dennis Schroder (24)
| Kent Bazemore (9)
| Dennis Schroder (10)
| Staples Center17,422
| 52–14
|- style="background:#cfc;"
| 67
| March 16
| @ Sacramento
| 
| Jeff Teague (23)
| Paul Millsap (10)
| Teague & Schröder (6)
| Sleep Train Arena16,835
| 53–14
|- style="background:#fcc;"
| 68
| March 18
| @ Golden State
| 
| Carroll & Millsap (16)
| DeMarre Carroll (12)
| Shelvin Mack (5)
| Oracle Arena19,596
| 53–15
|- style="background:#fcc;"
| 69
| March 20
| @ Oklahoma City
| 
| Pero Antic (22)
| Al Horford (11)
| Horford & Mack & Schröder (4)
| Chesapeake Energy Arena18,203
| 53–16
|- style="background:#fcc;"
| 70
| March 22
| San Antonio
| 
| Paul Millsap (22)
| Paul Millsap (7)
| Jeff Teague (6)
| Philips Arena19,193
| 53–17
|- style="background:#cfc;"
| 71
| March 25
| @ Orlando
| 
| Paul Millsap (25)
| Paul Millsap (11)
| Jeff Teague (9)
| Amway Center17,224
| 54–17
|- style="background:#cfc;"
| 72
| March 27
| Miami
| 
| DeMarre Carroll (24)
| Paul Millsap (9)
| Dennis Schröder (11)
| Philips Arena19,233
| 55–17
|- style="background:#fcc;"
| 73
| March 28
| @ Charlotte
| 
| Kent Bazemore (20)
| Mike Muscala (10)
| Dennis Schroder (11)
| Time Warner Cable Arena19,122
| 55–18
|- style="background:#cfc;"
| 74
| March 30
| Milwaukee
| 
| DeMarre Carroll (23)
| Paul Millsap (9)
| Jeff Teague (9)
| Philips Arena18,453
| 56–18
|- style="background:#fcc;"
| 75
| March 31
| @ Detroit
| 
| Thabo Sefolosha (19)
| Mike Muscala (13)
| Shelvin Mack (5)
| The Palace of Auburn Hills14,242
| 56–19

|- style="background:#cfc;"
| 76
| April 4
| Brooklyn
| 
| Carroll & Horford (20)
| DeMarre Carroll (8)
| Jeff Teague (8)
| Philips Arena18,769
| 57–19
|- style="background:#cfc;"
| 77
| April 7
| Phoenix
| 
| Carroll & Muscala & Teague (16)
| Kent Bazemore (9)
| Mack & Schroder (4)
| Philips Arena18,650
| 58–19
|- style="background:#cfc;"
| 78
| April 8
| @ Brooklyn
| 
| Al Horford (24)
| DeMarre Carroll (9)
| Jeff Teague (12)
| Barclays Center17,732
| 59–19
|- style="background:#cfc;"
| 79
| April 10
| Charlotte
| 
| Mike Muscala (17)
| Al Horford (8)
| Jeff Teague (8)
| Philips Arena18,452
| 60–19
|- style="background:#fcc;"
| 80
| April 12
| @ Washington
| 
| Mike Scott (19)
| Pero Antic (7)
| Shelvin Mack (6)
| Verizon Center19,041
| 60–20
|- style="background:#fcc;"
| 81
| April 13
| New York
| 
| Korver & Teague (19)
| Bazemore & Horford & Scott (6)
| Jeff Teague (9)
| Philips Arena18,265
| 60–21
|- style="background:#fcc;"
| 82
| April 15
| @ Chicago
|
| Dennis Schroder (21)
| Al Horford (7)
| Horford & Millsap & Teaguet (4)
| United Center22,172
| 60–22

Playoffs

|- style="background:#bfb;"
| 1
| April 19
| Brooklyn
| 
| Kyle Korver (21)
| Al Horford (10)
| Carroll, Korver, Teague (3)
| Philips Arena18,440
| 1–0
|- style="background:#bfb;"
| 2
| April 22
| Brooklyn
| 
| Paul Millsap (19)
| Al Horford (13)
| Al Horford (7)
| Philips Arena18,207
| 2–0
|- style="background:#fbb;"
| 3
| April 25
| @ Brooklyn
| 
| DeMarre Carroll (22)
| Paul Millsap (17)
| Jeff Teague (6)
| Barclays Center17,732
| 2–1
|- style="background:#fbb;"
| 4
| April 27
| @ Brooklyn
| 
| Carroll, Teague (20)
| Paul Millsap (12)
| Jeff Teague (11)
| Barclays Center17,732
| 2–2
|- style="background:#bfb;"
| 5
| April 29
| Brooklyn
| 
| DeMarre Carroll (24)
| Al Horford (15)
| Jeff Teague (8)
| Philips Arena18,105
| 3–2
|- style="background:#bfb;"
| 6
| May 1
| @ Brooklyn
| 
| Paul Millsap (25)
| Paul Millsap (9)
| Jeff Teague (13)
| Barclays Center17,732
| 4–2

|- style="background:#fbb;"
| 1
| May 3
| Washington
| 
| DeMarre Carroll (24)
| Al Horford (17)
| Paul Millsap (8)
| Philips Arena18,148
| 0–1
|- style="background:#bfb;"
| 2
| May 5
| Washington
| 
| DeMarre Carroll (22)
| Paul Millsap (11)
| Jeff Teague (8)
| Philips Arena18,131
| 1–1
|- style="background:#fbb;"
| 3
| May 9
| @ Washington
| 
| Teague, Schroder (18)
| Al Horford (10)
| Jeff Teague (7)
| Verizon Center20,356
| 1–2
|- style="background:#bfb;"
| 4
| May 11
| @ Washington
| 
| Jeff Teague (26)
| Al Horford (10)
| Teague, Schroder (8)
| Verizon Center20,356
| 2–2
|- style="background:#bfb;"
| 5
| May 13
| Washington
| 
| Al Horford (23)
| Al Horford (11)
| Dennis Schroder (7)
| Philips Arena18,854
| 3–2
|- style="background:#bfb;"
| 6
| May 15
| @ Washington
| 
| DeMarre Carroll (25)
| Paul Millsap (13)
| Jeff Teague (7)
| Verizon Center20,356
| 4–2

|- style="background:#fbb;"
| 1
| May 20
| Cleveland
| 
| Jeff Teague (27)
| Millsap, Horford, Korver (7)
| Teague, Schroder (4)
|Philips Arena18,489
| 0–1
|- style="background:#fbb;"
| 2
| May 22
| Cleveland
| 
| Dennis Schröder (13)
| Mike Scott (7)
| Jeff Teague (6)
| Philips Arena18,670
| 0–2
|- style="background:#fbb;"
| 3
| May 24
| @ Cleveland
| 
| Jeff Teague (30)
| Millsap, Scott (9)
| Jeff Teague (7)
| Quicken Loans Arena20,562
| 0–3
|- style="background:#fbb;"
| 4
| May 26
| @ Cleveland
| 
| Jeff Teague (17)
| Paul Millsap (10)
| Millsap, Horford (5)
| Quicken Loans Arena20,562
| 0–4

Player statistics

Regular season

|- align="center" bgcolor=""
|  || 63 || 3 || 16.5 || .365 || .301 || .720 || 3.0 || 0.8 || 0.3 || 0.2 || 5.7
|- align="center" bgcolor="#f0f0f0"
|  || 75 || 10 || 17.7 || .426 || .364 || .600 || 3.0 || 1.0 || 0.7 || 0.4 || 5.2
|- align="center" bgcolor=""
|  || 36 || 4 || 13.5 || .442 || .000 || .520 || 2.8 || 0.6 || 0.5 || 0.7 || 2.7
|- align="center" bgcolor="#f0f0f0"
|  || 70 || 69 || 31.3 || .487 || .395 || .700 || 5.3 || 1.7 || 1.3 || 0.2 || 12.6
|- align="center" bgcolor=""
|  || 8 || 0 || 9.5 || .385 || .387 || .500 || 1.8 || 1.0 || 0.5 || 0.8 || 3.3
|- align="center" bgcolor="#f0f0f0"
|  || 0 || 0 || 0 || .000 || .000 || .000 || 0 || 0 || 0 || 0 || 0
|- align="center" bgcolor=""
|  || 76 || 76 || 30.5 || style=background:#002147;color:white;|.538 || .306 || .760 || 7.2 || 3.2 || 0.9 || style=background:#002147;color:white;|1.3 || 15.2
|- align="center" bgcolor="#f0f0f0"
|  || 24 || 3 || 12.4 || .495 || .404 || .840 || 1.6 || 0.5 || 0.4 || 0.0 || 5.6
|- align="center" bgcolor=""
|  || 75 || 75 || 32.2 || .487 || style=background:#002147;color:white;|.492 || style=background:#002147;color:white;|.900 || 4.1 || 2.6 || 0.7 || 0.6 || 12.1
|- align="center" bgcolor="#f0f0f0"
|  || 55 || 0 || 15.1 || .401 || .315 || .810 || 1.4 || 2.8 || 0.6 || 0.0 || 5.4
|- align="center" bgcolor=""
|  || 73 || 73 || style=background:#002147;color:white;|32.7 || .476 || .356 || .760 || style=background:#002147;color:white;|7.8 || 3.1 || style=background:#002147;color:white;|1.8 || 1.0 || style=background:#002147;color:white;|16.7
|- align="center" bgcolor="#f0f0f0"
|  || 40 || 8 || 12.6 || .550 || .409 || .880 || 3.0 || 0.6 || 0.4 || 0.5 || 4.9
|- align="center" bgcolor=""
|  || 3 || 0 || 6.3 || .286 || .000 || .500 || 1.3 || 0.0 || 0.3 || 0.0 || 1.7
|- align="center" bgcolor="#f0f0f0"
|  || 77 || 10 || 19.7 || .427 || .351 || .830 || 2.1 || 4.1 || 0.6 || 0.1 || 10.0
|- align="center" bgcolor=""
|  || 68 || 0 || 16.5 || .444 || .344 || .790 || 2.9 || 1.1 || 0.4 || 0.0 || 7.8
|- align="center" bgcolor="#f0f0f0"
|  || 52 || 7 || 18.8 || .418 || .321 || .780 || 4.3 || 1.4 || 1.0 || 0.4 || 5.3
|- align="center" bgcolor=""
|  || 73 || 72 || 30.5 || .460 || .343 || .860 || 2.5 || style=background:#002147;color:white;|7.0 || 1.7 || 0.4 || 15.9
|}

Injuries

Transactions

Trades

Free agents

Re-signed

Additions

* = Cut before regular season

Subtractions

References

External links

 2014–15 Atlanta Hawks preseason at ESPN
 2014–15 Atlanta Hawks regular season at ESPN

Atlanta Hawks seasons
Atlanta Hawks
Atlanta Haw
Atlanta Haw